The term Jewish lobby is used to describe organized lobbying attributed to Jews on domestic and foreign policy decisions, as political participants of representative government, conducted predominantly in the Jewish diaspora in a number of Western countries. When used to allege disproportionately favorable Jewish influence, it can be perceived as pejorative or as constituting antisemitism.

Descriptions
In his Dictionary of Politics (1992), Walter John Raymond describes the term "Jewish Lobby" as "A conglomeration of approximately thirty-four Jewish political organizations in the United States which make joint and separate efforts to lobby for their interests in the United States, as well as for the interests of the State of Israel." He also notes that "[a]mong those organizations which are most actively involved in lobbying activities at federal, state and local levels of political and governmental institutions are: the American Israel Public Affairs Committee (AIPAC), the American Jewish Committee... and the B'nai B'rith." Dominique Vidal, writing in Le Monde diplomatique, states that in the United States the term is "self-described" and it "is only one of many influence groups that have official standing with institutions and authorities."

The B'nai B'rith Anti-Defamation Commission of Australia states in its description, "It is important to recognise that lobbies are natural parts of pluralist, democratic societies such as Australia. Lobbying constitutes a mainstream method of influencing government policy, as a means of enhancing representative government. As such, just as other communities and interest groups have lobbies, there is a 'Jewish lobby' – an unwieldy group of individuals and organisations devoted to supporting the needs and interests of the Jewish community.  This Jewish lobby is a player in representative government, and its very existence confirms the ordinary place Jews have within Australian politics. The assumption, however, that Jews have a disproportionate power and influence over decision making is what transforms a descriptive reality about politics to an antisemitic argument about Jewish power."

Noting the high voting rate of individual American Jews in elections, J.J. Goldberg, editorial director of The Forward, stated in a 2004 speech that "The Jewish lobby... is actually more than just a dozen organizations. The Anti-Defamation League, the American Jewish Committee, Hadassah, of course, AIPAC, but it is also the impact of the Jewish role. ... So, the Jewish influence is a lot of things.  It is the organizations, it's the vote, it's fundraising."

Criticism of the term

Viewed as inaccurate
Mitchell Bard, director of the non-profit Jewish Virtual Library, writes that: "Reference is often made to the 'Jewish lobby' in an effort to describe Jewish influence, but this term is both vague and inadequate. While it is true that American Jews are sometimes represented by lobbyists, such direct efforts to influence policy-makers are but a small part of the lobby's ability to shape policy." Bard argues the term Israel lobby is more accurate, because it comprises both formal and informal elements (which includes public opinion), and "...because a large proportion of the lobby is made up of non-Jews." In his 1987 work, The Lobby: Jewish Political Power and American Foreign Policy, Edward Tivnan states that the term "needed some fine-tuning; what was most at issue... was the influence of the 'pro-Israel lobby.'"

In a letter to the editor of the New York Times Sunday Review of Books, responding to a review by Leslie Gelb of their 2007 book The Israel Lobby and U.S. Foreign Policy,  University of Chicago professor John Mearsheimer and Harvard University professor Stephen Walt write: "Gelb refers repeatedly to a 'Jewish lobby,' despite the fact that we never employ the term in our book. Indeed, we explicitly rejected this label as inaccurate and misleading, both because the lobby includes non-Jews like the Christian Zionists and because many Jewish Americans do not support the hard-line policies favored by its most powerful elements." The previous week, in a live Q&A session at The Washington Post, they stated they themselves "never use the term 'Jewish lobby' because the lobby is defined by its political agenda, not by religion or ethnicity."

Viewed as antisemitic and/or pejorative
Robert S. Wistrich, of the International Center for the Study of Antisemitism, Hebrew University of Jerusalem, sees reference to the phrase, when used to describe an "all-powerful 'Jewish Lobby' that prevents justice in the Middle East", as reliance on a classic antisemitic stereotype.

Bruno Bettelheim detested the term, arguing "The self-importance of Jews combined with the paranoia of the anti-Semite had created the image of this lobby."  Michael Lasky describes the term as an "unfortunate phrase", and "imagines" that Alexander Walker's use of it while writing about the Nazi films of Leni Riefenstahl was not intended pejoratively.

The B'nai B'rith Anti-Defamation Commission of Australia states that "the stereotype of the 'Jewish lobby' is that the Jewish engagement in politics and policy debate is above and beyond the ordinary participation of a group in public policy-making. It paints Jewish involvement as surreptitious, and as subverting the democratic process. It alleges that a 'Jewish lobby', through bribery, bullying and manipulation, pressures politicians to act against their will and duties." Michael Visontay, editor of Australia's The Sydney Morning Herald, wrote in 2003 that "The way the phrase 'Jewish lobby' has been bandied about in numerous letters implies there is something inherently sinister in lobbying when Jews do it." According to Geoffrey Brahm Levey and Philip Mendes, the term is used in Australia as a pejorative description of the way in which the Jewish community influences the Liberal Party "by talking to its leaders and making them aware of Jewish wishes and views".

Dominique Schnapper, Chantal Bordes-Benayoun and Freddy Raphaėl write that following the 1991 Gulf War, the term "began to be heard in political life" in France. Vidal writes that the term has been used there exclusively by the French far right as "a phrase that combines standard anti-semitic fantasies about Jewish finance, media control and power; the term is the contemporary equivalent of the Protocols of the Elders of Zion". Loyola University Chicago professor Wiley Feinstein wrote in 2003 that "there is much talk of the 'Jewish lobby' in the Italian Press and in Europe", describing the term as "a phrase[] of scorn for Jews and Judaism".

William Safire wrote in 1993 that in the United Kingdom "Jewish lobby" is used as an "even more pejorative" term for "the 'Israel lobby'". Susan Jacobs of Manchester Metropolitan University writes that the phrase "Jewish lobby", when used "without mentioning other 'lobbies' or differentiating Jews who have different political positions on a number of questions, including Israel and Palestine", is a contemporary form of the fear of a Jewish conspiracy.

Defense of the term
In a 2004 speech, Goldberg said, "There has been an awful lot of talk in the last few years about the rise of the Jewish lobby and the influence of the Jewish lobby. It used to be that you couldn't talk about this sort of thing.  When I wrote [the book] Jewish Power in 1996... I was accused by various Jewish lobbyists of inflating and buying into the old myths of international Jewish conspiracies simply by the use of the title." Goldberg disagrees with the sensitivity towards the use of the term, arguing that: "There is such a thing as a Jewish lobby, that the network of organizations that works together to put across what might be called the Jewish community's view on world affairs is not insignificant, it's not an invention, but it is not some sort of all-powerful octopus that it's sometimes portrayed as these days." Mearsheimer and Walt wrote in 2006 that "even the Israeli media refer to America's 'Jewish Lobby'", and stated the following year that "AIPAC and the Conference of Presidents and the Israeli media themselves refer to America's 'Jewish Lobby'."

Reaction to the term's use
After South African activist, Christian cleric, and Nobel Peace Prize winner Desmond Tutu used it in a 1985 speech at the Jewish Theological Seminary of America, a supporter wrote him privately urging him to avoid the phrase, stating it was "language... normally associated with the less than philo-Semitic elements of our acquaintance". Tutu used the phrase again in a 2002 editorial in The Guardian, stating "People are scared in this country [the US], to say wrong is wrong because the Jewish lobby is powerful – very powerful. Well, so what? For goodness sake, this is God's world!" When he edited and reprinted parts of his speech in 2005, Tutu replaced the words "Jewish lobby" with "pro-Israeli lobby". In 2007, an invitation to Tutu to speak at the University of St. Thomas in Minnesota was rescinded because of the speech; writing in Mother Jones, Justin Elliot stated "Tutu's use of the phrase 'Jewish lobby' is regrettable, mainly because the pro-Israel lobby he is referring to is not made up exclusively of Jews, example Texas preacher John Hagee's Christians United for Israel. But one minor slip five years ago is hardly grounds for blacklisting him."

Chris Davies, MEP for the northwest of England was forced to resign in 2006 as leader of the Liberal Democrats group in the European Parliament after writing to a constituent "I shall denounce the influence of the Jewish lobby that seems to have far too great a say over the political decision-making process in many countries." In comments to TotallyJewish.Com he "confessed he didn't know the difference between referring to the 'pro Israel lobby' and the 'Jewish lobby'," and added "I'm quite prepared to accept that I don't understand the semantics of some of these things." Commenting on Davies' use of the term, David Hirsh of The Guardian wrote that Davies "had to resign because his laudable instinct to side with the underdog was not tempered by care, thought or self-education."  He compared Davies' rhetoric with the "care to avoid openly antisemitic rhetoric taken by sophisticates like Mearsheimer and Walt and Robert Fisk."

A 2007 editorial in The New York Sun accused Richard Dawkins, a British evolutionary biologist and writer, of repeating antisemitic conspiracy theories after he used the term in an interview published in The Guardian. In the interview Dawkins said: "When you think about how fantastically successful the Jewish lobby has been, though, in fact, they are less numerous I am told – religious Jews anyway – than atheists and [yet they] more or less monopolise American foreign policy as far as many people can see. So if atheists could achieve a small fraction of that influence, the world would be a better place." In a National Review column discussing the influence of "high-profile atheists" on the American left, Arthur C. Brooks wrote that Dawkins' claim was "anti-Semitic, slanders religion, and asserts victimhood." David Cesarani, commenting in The Guardian, stated that "Mearsheimer and Walt would doubtless chide Dawkins for using the term 'Jewish lobby', which they studiously avoid in order to give no truck to anti-Jewish innuendo."

Activities
In his book Jewish Power, Goldberg writes that in the United States the "Jewish lobby" for decades played a leadership role in formulating American policy on issues such as civil rights, separation of church and state, and immigration, guided by a liberalism that was a complex mixture of Jewish tradition, the experience of persecution, and self-interest. It was thrust into prominence following the Nixon Administration's sharp shift of American policy towards significant military and foreign aid support for Israel following the 1973 Yom Kippur War.

Tivnan writes that a "full-fledged 'Jewish lobby'" was developed in 1943, in which the moderates represented by Stephen Samuel Wise and the American Jewish Committee were defeated by supporters of Abba Hillel Silver and "the maximalist goal of a 'Jewish Commonwealth'" at the American Jewish and Biltmore Conferences.  Silver became the new leader of American Zionism, with his call for "loud diplomacy", and he then "cranked up the Zionist Organization of America's one-man lobbying operation in Washington—renaming it the American Zionist Emergency Council (AZEC)—and began to mobilize American Jewry into a mass movement."

Former New York Times journalist Youssef Ibrahim writes: "That there is a Jewish lobby in America concerned with the well-being of Israel is a silly question. It is insane to ask whether the 6 million American Jews should be concerned about the 6 million Israeli Jews, particularly in view of the massacre of another 6 million Jews in the Holocaust. It's elementary, my dear Watson: Any people who do not care for their own are not worthy of concern. And what the Israel lobby does is what all ethnic lobbies — Greek, Armenian, Latvian, Irish, Cuban, and others — do in this democracy."

See also
 Diaspora politics in the United States
 Ethnic interest groups in the United States
 Israel lobby in the United Kingdom
 Israel lobby in the United States
 JCall

References

Further reading
 Rafael Medoff, Jewish Americans and political participation: a reference handbook Chapter 4, The Jewish Lobby
 Alan J. Ward, Immigrant Minority "Diplomacy": American Jews and Russia, 1901 – 1912, 1964, British Association for American Studies
 Hasia R. Diner, The Jews of the United States, 1654 to 2000, (2004), University of California Press

 
Antisemitic canards
Conspiracy theories involving Jews